A list of windmills in the Belgian province of Namur.

Notes
Bold indicates a mill that is still standing. Italics indicates a mill with some remains surviving.

Buildings and structures in Namur (province)
Tourist attractions in Namur (province)
Namur